The Chennai Egmore–Thanjavur main line (via Kumbakonam ) connects  and  both in the Indian state of Tamil Nadu. The Chennai Egmore–Thanjavur main line is part of Chennai–Viluppuram–Chidambaram-Mayiladuthurai––Thanjavur–Tiruchirappalli line. There are several branch lines (included here): Chengalpattu–Arakkonam links to Chennai Central–Bengaluru City line, Guntakal–Chennai Egmore section, Viluppuram–Puducherry, Cuddalore–Virudhachalam, Mayiladuthurai–Thiruvarur, and Peralam–Nagapattinam sectors. The line connects the Kaveri delta to Chennai.

History 
The "main line" of the metre-gauge railway system in the Coromandel Coast connected Chennai with Tiruchchirappalli via Viluppuram, Cuddalore, Chidambaram, Mayiladuthurai, Kumbakonam, and  junctions. The Chennai–Mayiladuthurai–Thanjavur–Tiruchirappalli line continues to be thought of as the "main line".

It was a new development south of Chennai. After taking over of GSIR by South Indian Railway Company in 1874, the Nagapattinam–Tiruchirapalli line was converted to -wide metre gauge in 1875. Again after conversion, the -long -wide broad-gauge line between Nagapattinam and Tiruchirapalli was opened in 2001–02

The South India Railway Company laid a -long metre-gauge trunk line from Chennai to Thoothukudi via Viluppuram, Cuddalore Port (then known as Cuddalore Junction), Mayiladuthurai, Thanjavur, Tiruchirapalli (then known as Trichinopoly), Madurai, Virudhunagar in 1880. But during gauge conversion in years 1995–2000 the -long Tindivanam–Cuddalore Port (then known as Cuddalore Junction) sector, -long Cuddalore Port–Porto Novo sector & -long Shyali–Mayiladuthurai sector were never made into -wide  broad gauge line.

Following an agreement between the British and the French, a -long metre-gauge line was laid between Puducherry and Viluppuram around 1877–1879.

A -wide line was laid between Arakkonam and Kanchipuram (then known as Conjeevaram) in 1865 by Indian Tramway Company. The line was converted to metre gauge in 1878 and opened in 1891. The Chengalpattu–Walajabad line was opened in 1880.

The -long Mayiladuthurai–Tharangambadi (then known as Tranquebar) line which was opened by British for people in 1926 and was closed in 1987 for broad gauge conversion. But the project is standing still for 33 years now

Suburban railway 

A major part of the South Line, Chennai Suburban is part of this line. The area south of Chennai was served by a single line shared by passenger and goods trains till 1931. Electric trains in the sector were planned as early as 1923. Construction work began in 1926 and was completed in 1931. The first MG EMU services were run on 1.5 kV DC overhead lines on 11 May 1931. In the 1960s the Chennai Beach–Tambaram–Viluppuram sector was converted from 1.5 kV DC traction to 25 kV AC traction and limited EMU services were extended to Chengalpet. In 1969, an additional metre-gauge track was laid between Tambaram and Chengalpet. Starting with the 1995s the entire area was converted to broad gauge.

Gauge conversions 
With the conversion from metre gauge to broad gauge, the entire -long Egmore–Tambaram–Tiruchirapalli–Dindigul–Madurai sector was completed, broad-gauge passenger traffic was initiated in March 2001. The left over conversion work was then completed and the last metre-gauge EMU service ran between Tambaram and Egmore on 1 July 2004.

Conversion from metre gauge to broad gauge of the Viluppuram–Puducherry branch line was completed in 2004. The – sector was converted in 2003. After conversion work of the Thanjavur–Tiruvarur broad-gauge section was opened to traffic in 2006 and Tiruvarur–Nagore section in 2010.

The -long Viluppuram–Thanjavur was converted to broad gauge in 2010.

A broad-gauge line (conversion from metre-gauge) connecting Chengalpattu with Arakkonam was built in 1999–2000. The Thakolam–Arakkonam sector had to be realigned because of its proximity to the Arakkonam Naval Air Station. Thakolam–Arakkonam sector as diverted another route start near Thakolam to Melpadi Goods Yard route end Complete 2019. This new route fully electrified complete Chengalpattu–Arakkonam line

Electrification 
The metre-gauge track of Madras Beach–Tambaram sector was electrified in 1931 with 1.5 kV DC overhead system. In the 1950s, Indian Railways decided on using 25 kV AC overhead system on a national basis. The Madras Beach–Tambaram sector was converted to 25 kV AC overhead system in 1967.

The Tambaram–Chengalpattu–Viluppuram sector was electrified in 1964–65 and then again in 2000–01 (after gauge conversion) along with the Chengalpattu–Kanchipuram sector.

The broad-gauge Viluppuram–Puducherry line was electrified in 2006.

The broad-gauge Viluppuram–Tiruchirapalli sector was electrified in 2010.

New electrification survey in 2012–13 had been sanctioned in the Railway Budget for the Karaikkal/Karaikkal port–Thiruvarur–Thanjavur–Tiruchchirappalli and Nagapattinam–Velankkani sectors.

The execution of electrification of Villupuram–Cuddalore Port–Chidambaram-Mayiladuturai–Kumbakonam–Thanjavur and Mayiladuturai–Thiruvarur has been given to Rail Vikas Nigam.

The main line (Villupuram to Tiruchirappalli via Mayiladuthurai) electrification was completed in several parts [as Tiruchirappalli to Thanjavur, Villupuram to Cuddalore Port Junction, Cuddalore Port Junction to Mayiladuthurai Junction and then Mayiladuthurai Junction to Thanjavur Junction] and opened for end to end travel for public on 14 November 2020.

Railway reorganization 
The Great Southern Railway of India and Carnatic Railway merged to form South Indian Railway Company in 1874.

In the early 1950s legislation was passed authorizing the central government to take over independent railway systems that were there. On 14 April 1951 the Madras and Southern Mahratta Railway, the South Indian Railway Company and Mysuru State Railway were merged to form Southern Railway. Subsequently, Nizam's Guaranteed State Railway was also merged into Southern Railway. On 2 October 1966, the Secunderabad, Solapur, Hubli and Vijayawada Divisions, covering the former territories of Nizam's Guaranteed State Railway and certain portions of Madras and Southern Mahratta Railway were separated from Southern Railway to form the South Central Railway.  In 1977, Guntakal division of Southern Railway was transferred to South Central Railway and the Solapur division transferred to Central Railway. Amongst the seven new zones created in 2010 was South Western Railway, which was carved out of Southern Railway.

References

External links 
 Official website of Southern Railway zone

5 ft 6 in gauge railways in India
Rail transport in Tamil Nadu

Railway lines opened in 1880
Transport in Chennai